Aelia is a genus of shield bug belonging to the family Pentatomidae.

Species
These 15 species belong to the genus Aelia:

 Aelia acuminata (Linnaeus, 1758) i c g
 Aelia albovittata Fieber, 1868 g
 Aelia alticola Kiritshenko, 1914 g
 Aelia americana Dallas, 1851 i c g b
 Aelia angusta Stehlik, 1976 g
 Aelia cognata Fieber, 1868
 Aelia cribrosa Fieber, 1868 g
 Aelia furcula Fieber, 1868 g
 Aelia germari Küster, 1852 g
 Aelia klugii Hahn, 1833 g
 Aelia melanota Fieber, 1868 g
 Aelia notata Rey, 1887 g
 Aelia rostrata Boheman, 1852 g
 Aelia sibirica Reuter, 1884 g
 Aelia virgata (Herrich-Schaeffer, 1841) g

Data sources: i = ITIS, c = Catalogue of Life, g = GBIF, b = Bugguide.net

References

Aelini
Pentatomidae genera
Hemiptera of Europe